Pikes Peak State College is a public community college in Colorado Springs, Colorado. It is the largest institution of higher education in the Pikes Peak region. PPSC offers more than 150 programs in liberal arts and sciences transfer and career technical education.  The college's 60+60 Bachelor's Degree Transfer Program guarantees transfer of the PPSC Associate of Arts or Associate of Science degrees to any public institution of higher education in Colorado. Students take two years of study at PPSC, then transfer as a junior to the four-year college or university of their choice.

History
Pikes Peak State College was originally founded as El Paso Community College in 1968 without an official college campus.  In 1978 a new campus was constructed on surplus land on the northern edge of Fort Carson; at the same time the college name was changed to Pikes Peak Community College.

During the 2022 Colorado legislative session, college administrators, along with state elected officials, introduced legislation to change the name of the college.  The purpose of the bill was to change the perceived value of community colleges and to better reflect the broad range of degrees available.  The bill was signed by Colorado Governor Jared Polis which officially changed Pikes Peak Community College to Pikes Peak State College.

Campuses

Pikes Peak State College has three full-service campuses, three military satellite locations, and an extensive distance education program.  The largest campus, the Centennial Campus, is located in southern Colorado Springs near the Fort Carson Army post.  The Downtown Studio Campus is located in the heart of downtown Colorado Springs, the Rampart Range Campus is located at the north end of the city.

While students may study General Education (CORE) courses at all four campuses, certain programs are site specific. Centennial Campus is the largest, and offers all academic disciplines as well as several career and technical programs including an emergency medical services (EMS) training program with a state-of-the-art EMS simulation (SIM) Lab.  Rampart Range Campus hosts some of the college's Health Sciences programs, including the Nursing Program, which includes a state-of-the-art Nursing SIM Lab.  The Downtown Studio Campus is a hub for the fine arts programs. In 2008 the Falcon Campus was opened, but is no longer in service to the College. Three satellite education centers offer a variety of courses and programs at local Military bases. Courses for military education are held at various dates and times which are different from the traditional semester.

Notable alumni
Max Aaron, 2013 U.S. national champion figure skater
Dartanyon Crockett, 2014 judo World Champion 
Alexa Scimeca, 2013 U.S. National silver medalist figure skater
Leslie Smith, professional mixed martial arts fighter competing in the bantamweight division, formerly with the UFC
Ron Stallworth, police officer and author whose novel, Black Klansman, was turned into a film by Spike Lee

References

External links
Official website

Colorado Community College System
Buildings and structures in Colorado Springs, Colorado
Education in Colorado Springs, Colorado
Education in El Paso County, Colorado
Educational institutions established in 1968
1968 establishments in Colorado